Ceanothus spinosus, with the common names greenbark and redheart, is a species of Ceanothus. It is native to southern California and northern Baja California, where it grows in the scrub and chaparral of the coastal mountain ranges.

Range and habitat

Growth pattern
Ceanothus spinosus is a large treelike shrub approaching  in maximum height.

Leaves and stems
Leaves have a single main vein rising from the leaf base. The thick, firm evergreen leaves are hairless, oval, and up to an inch wide, with smooth margins.

The bark is smooth and olive green, giving rise to its common name. The stem is a rough-barked trunk near the base. Branches are stiff and sharp, or spiny, at the tips. "Ceanothus" means "spiny plant" in Greek, and the species name, "spinosus", means that it is even more spiny.

The stipules (small leaf-like structures at the base of the leaf stem) are thin and fall off early.

Inflorescence and fruit
The shrub blooms in inflorescences up to 15 centimeters long filled with clusters of white to pale blue flowers. The fruit is a smooth, round capsule about half a centimeter wide containing three lobes.

Fruits do not have horns, as do some other members of the genus.

It blooms from February to May.

References

External links
Jepson Manual Treatment — Ceanothus spinosus
CalFlora Database: Ceanothus spinosus (greenbark ceanothus)
USDA Plants Profile: Ceanothus spinosus (greenbark ceanothus)
Ceanothus spinosus — U.C. Photo gallery

spinosus
Flora of California
Flora of Baja California
Natural history of the California chaparral and woodlands
Natural history of the Peninsular Ranges
Natural history of the Santa Monica Mountains
Natural history of the Transverse Ranges
Taxa named by Thomas Nuttall
Flora without expected TNC conservation status